Slovenská strela (Slovak for "Slovak Arrow") is the name of an express train, first operated by ČSD in Czechoslovakia on the line between Bratislava and Prague.

Introduced in 1936, Slovenská strela served as a ČSD flagship between the metropolises of Slovakia and Bohemia. It originally completed the route in 4 hours and 51 minutes. It originally ran with unique motor units also named Slovenská strela, later with various motor, steam and electric locomotives.

The train has been in service ever since, except for the wartime years 1939–1945. However, in 1965–1967, the train was renamed to Ostrava-Bratislava express.

From December 2006 to 12 December 2009, as well as in 2011, the high-speed Pendolino ETR 680, manufactured in Italy and owned by Czech Railways as ČD Class 680 was introduced to this express.

In the 2010-timetable and from 2012 onwards, the train was operating on the route Bratislava - Břeclav as EC 277/278 with through coaches from Bratislava to Prague and Ostseebad Binz, and from Prague detaching from EC 177 to Vienna. In the 2013 timetable, a through train between Bratislava and Stralsund via Prague and Berlin was named Slovenská strela.

See also 
 Rail transport in Slovakia
 Rail transport in the Czech Republic
 ČSD Class M 290.0

References

External links 
 Slovenská strela restoration project
 Tatra Auto Club Slovakia
 M290 at Parostroj

Named passenger trains of the Czech Republic
Named passenger trains of Slovakia
Railway services introduced in 1936